Locos de amor 2 is a 2018 Peruvian musical romantic comedy film directed by Frank Pérez-Garland and written by Bruno Ascenzo and Mariana Silva. The film is a sequel to Locos de amor and stars Carlos Alcántara, Marco Zunino, Paul Vega, Vanessa Saba, Bruno Ascenzo, Johanna San Miguel, Wendy Ramos and Erika Villalobos. It was premiered on February 14, 2018 in Peruvian theaters.

Synopsis 
What happens if you put together a heartbroken music lover with a jilted romance counselor and her hot friend fresh from Miami? Or a woman desperate to be a mother with a single father and a failed husband in the middle? Or a woman who just wants to have fun with a man who only thinks of her? The result is a very funny romantic comedy where the characters discover that it is never too late to go crazy with love.

Cast 

 Carlos Alcántara as Vicente
 Marco Zunino as Santiago
 Vanessa Saba as Daniela
 Paul Vega as Luis Izquierdo
 Johanna San Miguel as Loneliness
 Julián Gil as Gianprieto
 Wendy Ramos as Marisol
 Erika Villalobos as Patricia
 Nicolás Galindo as Engineer
 Mayra Goñi
 Bernie Peace
 Bruno Ascenzo

Production 
The filming of the film began in August 2017, where new actors such as Marco Zunino, Vanessa Saba, Paul Vega, among others, joined. The film was filmed in different locations, such as Lima, Callao, Miraflores, Magdalena, Los Olivos and La Punta. The filming ended in mid-September after 5 weeks of filming.

Soundtrack 

 Todo se derrumbó dentro de mí by Emmanuel
 ¿Cómo te va, mi amor? by Pandora
 O quizás simplemente le regale una rosa by Leonardo Favio
 Lluvia by Luis Ángel
 ¿A quién le importa? by Alaska y Dinarama
 Sólo pienso en ti by Guillermo Dávila
 Hoy tengo ganas de ti by Miguel Gallardo
 Maldita primavera by Javiera y Los Imposibles
 Detrás de mi ventana by Yuri
 Será porque te amo by Ricchi e Poveri
 Vale la pena by Marcos Llunas
 Amante bandido by Miguel Bosé
 Te amaré by Miguel Bosé
 Debes comprenderme by i Pooh
 Un montón de estrellas by Polo Montañez
 Yo no te pido la luna by Daniela Romo
 Locos de amor by Yordano

Sequel 
In mid-August 2019, the start of filming for the third part for 2020, Locos de amor 3, was announced, this time starring Sergio Galliani, Aldo Miyashiro, Orlando Fundichely, Leonardo Torres Vilar, Ebelin Ortiz, Katia Condos, Patricia Portocarrero and Rebeca Escribens. It was released on February 13, 2020.

References

External links 

 

2018 films
2018 romantic comedy films
Peruvian musical films
Peruvian romantic comedy films
Tondero Producciones films
2010s Peruvian films
2010s Spanish-language films

Films set in Peru
Films shot in Peru
Films set in Miami
Peruvian sequel films